This is a list of mystery writers:

A–C

D–G

H–L

M–Q

R–Z

See also
Mystery fiction
List of female detective/mystery writers
List of European mystery writers
List of Asian crime fiction writers
List of crime writers
List of thriller writers
Lists of writers

References

External links 
Official site of the Mystery Writers of America
Great Manhattan Mystery Conclave

Mystery writers
List of mystery writers